The 1975 PGA Championship was the 57th PGA Championship, played August 7–10 at the South Course of Firestone Country Club in Akron, Ohio. Jack Nicklaus, an Ohio native, won the fourth of his five PGA Championships and the fourteenth of his eighteen major titles, two strokes ahead of runner-up Bruce Crampton. He was also the 54-hole leader, four strokes ahead of Crampton.

It was the second major of the year for Nicklaus, who won his fifth green jacket in April at the Masters, and the fourth of five times that he won two majors in the same calendar year.

Through 2021, this was the fourth and most recent time a player won the Masters and PGA Championship in the same calendar year. Nicklaus had previously won both in 1963, preceded by Jack Burke Jr. (1956) and Sam Snead (1949). Nicklaus also held both titles after a Masters win in 1972, and Tiger Woods held all four major titles after his Masters win in 2001.

This was the third PGA Championship at the South Course, which previously hosted in 1960 and 1966. It also a former venue for the WGC-Bridgestone Invitational, which began in 1976 as the "World Series of Golf" on the PGA Tour, preceded by the American Golf Classic, which debuted in 1961.

Past champions in the field

Made the cut

Missed the cut

Source:

Round summaries

First round
Thursday, August 7, 1975

Source:

Second round
Friday, August 8, 1975

Source:

Third round
Saturday, August 9, 1975

Source:

Final round
Sunday, August 10, 1975

Source:

References

External links
PGA.com – 1975 PGA Championship

PGA Championship
Golf in Ohio
Sports competitions in Ohio
Sports in Akron, Ohio
PGA Championship
PGA Championship
PGA Championship
PGA Championship